Khanom is the northernmost district (amphoe) of Nakhon Si Thammarat province, southern Thailand.

Geography
The district is in the north of the province. To the west is Surat Thani province, while to the north and east is the Gulf of Thailand. Neighboring districts are (from the south clockwise) Sichon of Nakhon Si Thammarat and Don Sak of Surat Thani.

Most of the coast line of district will be protected as part of the Hat Khanom - Mu Ko Thale Tai National Park, which is in the process of creation. The coast of the district consists of a series of beaches among the limestone and shale mountains of northern Nakhon Si Thammarat Range. Nai Plao Beach is the most popular of these beaches. Several caves are found in the hills, the most famous one is Khao Wang Thong cave. The major hills within the districts are Khao Luang, Khao Phlao and Khao Dat Fa at the southeastern boundary to Sichon, and Khao Chai Son adjacent Khanom town at the Khanom Bay, the mouth of Khlong Khanom.

The main road is Highway 401, which passes through the southwestern part of the district. Route 4014 connects the district center which that highway, while Hwy 4142 connects the center with Don Sak.

Khao Nom (เขานม), was one of the former names of Khanom District owing to the breast-shaped surrounding mountains.

History
In 1365 a first town (mueang) named Tranom (ตระนอม) was established, which was a subordinate of Nakhon Si Thammarat. During the thesaphiban administrative reforms of the early-20th century it became a tambon in Sichon District. On 1 March 1939 it was made a minor district (king amphoe), consisting of the two tambons Khanom and Thong Nian. The minor district was upgraded to a full district on 11 December 1959.

A third tambon, Khuan Thong, was created on 25 December 1963 with three mubans from Thong Nian and two from Khanom.

The sanitary district (sukhaphiban) Khanom was established on 28 December 1945, which became official on 28 January 1957. On 25 May 1999 it was converted to a township (thesaban tambon), as all sanitary districts were upgraded to municipalities.

Wat Kradangnga is the oldest Buddhist temple of the district, dating back to the Ayutthaya Kingdom.

Education
There are two high schools - Khanom Phitthaya High School and Thong Nian Khana Phi Ban High School - and a campus of the Rajamangala University of Technology Srivijaya.

Administration
The district is divided into three sub-districts (tambons), which are further subdivided into 34 villages (mubans). Khanom itself has sub-district municipality (thesaban tambon) status and covers part of tambon Khanom, village 1 and parts of village 3, altogether an area of 1.76 km2. Tambon Thong Nian forms another sub-district municipality. The non-municipal areas of tambon Khanom and Khuan Thong are each administered by a tambon administrative organization (TAO).

References

External links

amphoe.com 
Website of Khanom TAO
Website of Khanom township

Districts of Nakhon Si Thammarat province